The 1982 USC Trojans football team represented the University of Southern California (USC) in the 1982 NCAA Division I-A football season. In their seventh year under head coach John Robinson, the Trojans compiled an 8–3 record (5–2 against conference opponents), finished in a tie for third place in the Pacific-10 Conference (Pac-10), and outscored their opponents by a combined total of 302 to 143.  Due to probation, the Trojans were not eligible for postseason play.

Quarterback Sean Salisbury led the team in passing, completing 82 of 142 passes for 1,062 yards with six touchdowns and five interceptions.  Todd Spencer led the team in rushing with 141 carries for 596 yards and eight touchdowns. Jeff Simmons led the team in receiving yards with 56 catches for 973 yards and five touchdowns.

Schedule

Personnel

Game summaries

at Oklahoma

at Arizona

    
    
    
    
    
    
    
    
    
    
    
    
    
    
    

USC Defense: 3 INTs for TD (NCAA record)

at UCLA

Notre Dame

References

USC
USC Trojans football seasons
USC Trojans football